Halina Poświatowska (née Halina Myga, entered into church records as Helena Myga; born 9 May 1935 – 11 October 1967) was a Polish poet and writer, one of the most important figures in modern/contemporary Polish literature.

Poświatowska is famous for her lyrical poetry, and for her intellectual, passionate yet unsentimental poetry on the themes of death, love, existence, famous historical personages, especially women, as well as her mordant treatment of life, living, being, bees, cats and the sensual qualities of loving, grieving and desiring.

Biography 

Her first heart operation was performed in Philadelphia, in 1958, her sea passage on the Polish ocean liner MS Batory, the costs of her stay, and the procedure itself, funded by monies gathered in collection by Polish-Americans, and was successful enough to enable her to live for nine more years.  Instead of returning to Poland afterward, she enrolled at Smith College in Northampton, Massachusetts, where she completed her undergraduate studies in 3 years, commencing with no command of the English language whatsoever.  Then, turning down an offer of graduate admission with full financial support, extended to her by the faculty of Stanford University's Department of Philosophy, she returned to Poland, where she matriculated in Philosophy at the Jagellonian University, Kraków, and died before continuing on to complete the doctorate, as a 4th year student.

She died at 32 after a second heart operation, this time, performed in Poland, to correct an acquired chronic heart defect that limited her mobility and breathing, which befell her due to chronic chill as a 9-year-old child during the World War II German occupation of Poland.

Works 
 Hymn bałwochwalczy (1958)
 Opowieść dla przyjaciela (1967, prose)
 "Tańcząca Nina" [p. 19 in Wiersze wybrane, Jan Zych, ed.]
 "***('my nie wierzymy w piekło...')" [22]
 "***('Jestem Julią...') [35]
 ***('codziennie')" [352]
 "W przestrzeni i czasie" [400]
 "***('Kiedy Izolda umierała...')" [422]
 Bajka o sówce, która w dzień spać lubiła (a 10-page poem fable in strict rhyme)

Literary heritage 

Her works have been collected in the four-volume Dzieła (Works), published by Wydawnictwo Literackie, Kraków, Poland, 1997, of which the first two volumes (several hundred pages) are poems, and the latter two prose and letters, respectively. She is the subject of several scholarly books and many reprints. Her popularity as a poet continues unabated in Poland, and new translations have increased her importance to world literature. If her own poem content, as well as her own poetry translations are any indication, she was influenced by Ezra Pound, Lawrence Ferlinghetti, Federico García Lorca, Jacques Prévert, and a bevy of Slovene poets: Kajetan Kovič, Jože Udovič, Saša Vegri, Dane Zajc, as well as the classical Greek philosopher Aristotle, bees, cats, the color red, the texture of fur, Metropolitan Museum of Art's antiquity collections, and her contemporary Black American (Negro) city culture – in particular, the people of New York City, in Harlem.

Notable translations (ad hoc collections)

Books and journals 
 
 Ey zendegi tarkam koni mimiram. Gozine-ye ash'ar = Życie, umrę jeśli odejdziesz. Wybór wierszy, [trans. into the Persian] Alireza Doulatshahi, Ivonna Nowicka. Baal Publications, Tehran-Iran 2010, 93 p.  
 Indeed I love..., selected and transl. into the English by Maya Peretz, afterword by Anna Nasiłowska. Wydawnictwo Literackie, Kraków 1998, 2005, 233 pp. 
 Mon ombre est une femme, poèmes trad. du pol. par Isabelle Macor-Filarska et Grzegorz Splawinski. Éditions Caractères, Paris 2004, 100 p. 
 Racconto per un amico, trad. dal pol. di Vera Verdiani. Neri Pozza Editore, Vicenza dr. 2001, 175 p. 
 Oiseau de mon coeur..., choix et traduction Isabelle Macor-Filarska, Grzegorz Spławiński, postface Izolda Kiec. Wydawnictwo Literackie, Kraków 1998, 163 p. 
 Ošče edin spomen : poezija, proza, prev. ot pol. Zdravko Kis'ov, Blagovesta Lingorska. Karina M., Sofija 1997, 253 p.

Unpublished/Internet

References 

 Grażyna Borkowska, Nierozważna i nieromantyczna. O Halinie Poświatowskiej [Reckless and Unromantic. On Halina Poświatowska], Kraków: Wydawnictwo Literackie, 2001, first edition, paperback, pp. 204, . 
 Kalina Błażejowska, Uparte serce [A Stubborn Heart], Kraków: Wydawnictwo Znak, 2014, first edition, hardback, 338 pp,

Notes

External links 

 Comprehensive site that includes her original poetry, bio, indexes, photographs 
 HalinaFAQ complete corpus translation archive 
 An essay introducing a scholarly book on Poświatowska's poetry by Grażyna Borkowska, Nierozważna i nieromantyczna. O Halinie Poświatowskiej [Reckless and Unromantic. On Halina Poświatowska] (2014-04-30)
   
Halina Poświatowska collected works (Polish)
Halina Poświatowska biography (Polish)
 An interview with the biographer introducing a scholarly biography of Poświatowska by Kalina Błażejowska, Uparte serce [A Stubborn Heart] (2014-06-27)
  

1935 births
1967 deaths
Smith College alumni
Polish women poets
20th-century women writers
20th-century Polish poets
People from Częstochowa
20th-century Polish women